"Wild Boy" is a song by American rapper Machine Gun Kelly featuring fellow American rapper Waka Flocka Flame. The song, released September 27, 2011, serves as the lead single from Kelly's debut EP Half Naked & Almost Famous (2012). Produced by GB Hitz and Southside, the song was initially included on Kelly's third mixtape Rage Pack, and later included on his major-label debut studio album Lace Up.

Critical reception
Allmusic gave a mixed opinion on the song, criticizing its "Jackass-inspired dumbness", but commending Kelly's "underdog rhymes, hard-time tales, and heaps of Cleveland love". HipHopDX commented the track saying "MGK is joined by Waka Flocka Flame for a rowdy offering that is entertaining on the surface but lacks creative value". XXL defined the content of the song as "aggressive". Rolling Stone
defined the track as "crazy-ass and Bone Thugs-n-Harmony-tinged".

Music video
The music video, directed by Spliff TV and Maybach Music Films, was released to MGK's Vevo on November 16, 2011. The video depicts MGK at his girlfriend’s house having dinner with her parents along with the song’s featured artist Waka Flocka Flame. During dinner, the girl’s parents ask Waka Flocka Flame what he "does for a living," in which Waka Flocka Flame responds by hitting her father in the head with a glass bottle and the two artists answer with a wild warehouse performance of ‘Wild Boy’ where stage diving, bonfires, Steve-O references and partying ensues. The video features cameo appearances from jeweler Johnny Dang, comedian Katt Williams, and rapper Layzie Bone.

The video for the remix was released April 26, 2012.

Remixes
The official remix was released on March 14, 2012, which featured 2 Chainz, Meek Mill, Mystikal, French Montana, Yo Gotti and – the person who which the song is referenced – Steve-O providing an intro. The remix was officially released, removing Steve-O's intro and outro from the single, to digital retailers, like iTunes and Amazon on May 22, 2012 and again with Steve-O's intro and outro to digital retailers on May 29, 2012.

A remix from producer Ricky Luna was included on the soundtrack to the film Project X.

Credits and personnel
Credits adapted from the liner notes of Lace Up.

Recording
 MGK recording: Rage Cage Studios (Cleveland, OH)
 Waka Flocka Flame recording: Daddy's House Recording Studios (New York, NY)

Personnel
 GB Hitz – producer
 Southside – producer
 Justin Sampson – producer, assistant
 Steve "Rock Star" Dickey – mixer

Chart performance
The song debuted on the Billboard Hot 100 on the week of January 28, 2012 at number 98.

Weekly charts

Certifications

Release and radio history

References

External links
Lyrics of this song at Genius

2011 debut singles
2011 songs
Machine Gun Kelly (musician) songs
Waka Flocka Flame songs
Bad Boy Records singles
Interscope Records singles
Songs written by Waka Flocka Flame
Songs written by Southside (record producer)
Songs written by Machine Gun Kelly (musician)